Abdurahman Abubakar (Arabic: 
عبد الرحمن ابو بكر; born 3 August 1990) is a Qatari professional footballer who currently plays as a defender for Umm Salal in the Qatar Stars League.

Honours

Club 
El Jaish SC
Winner
 Qatar Crown Prince Cup: 2014
 Qatari Stars Cup: 2012–13

Runner-up
 Qatar Stars League: 2011–12, 2013–14

External links 
 

1990 births
Living people
Qatari footballers
El Jaish SC players
Qatar SC players
Al Kharaitiyat SC players
Umm Salal SC players
Qatar international footballers
Association football defenders
2015 AFC Asian Cup players
Naturalised citizens of Qatar
Qatari people of Saudi Arabian descent
Saudi Arabian emigrants to Qatar
Qatar Stars League players
Qatari Second Division players